Partners in Crime is a 2022 Philippine action-adventure comedy film starring Vice Ganda and Ivana Alawi. The film is directed by Cathy Garcia-Molina and is under the production of Star Cinema and Viva Films. It was one of the official entries for 2022 Metro Manila Film Festival and was released on December 25, 2022.

Premise
The film revolves around two former partner sweethearts who reunite as sworn enemies. As story progresses, they cross paths only for them to be caught up in a crime.

Plot
Jack Cayanan (Vice Ganda) is a successful television host of the show "Happy Hour with Jack". But because of his schedule, he has no time for his family. In an episode, Jack's voice began to become husky. Doctors advised Jack to rest, but he refused because many of his loyal fans will be disappointed. Then, he remembered his family, especially his former partner, Barbara Nicole Rose Albano (Ivana Alawi), whom he met while  hosting a Bingo event. Barbara and Jack became hosting partners in every event, calling their team-up as "JaBar". During a beauty pageant, Jack and Barbara were invited to become hosts on television. But, when Jack came, it was only he who was chosen as host, leaving Barbara frustrated. There, she broke up with Jack, but he reiterated that they were never in a relationship. 

Despite his illness, Jack went to his show. To his surprise, his former partner came and named herself Rose, a known social media influencer. In order to settle their differences, the network decided to have an exclusive interview with Don Bill Libme, the richest man in the Philippines, who survived 99 assassination attempts. When they saw a post saying waiters and waitresses were needed for Don Bill's 75th birthday, Jack and Rose decided to go so that they can have their interview. 

Jack disguised himself with a mole on his left cheek. But, Rose came also with a mole on her right cheek. One of Don Bill's maids recognized Jack and Rose, but, Jack asked her not to tell anyone about their identity. Then, an alarm rang, signifying that Don Bill was calling. Jack and Rose were in a chase to go first to him. They reached Don Bill's room and saw him, lifeless and stabbed with a syringe. One of Don Bill's maids Maritess saw Rose stabbing Don Bill with that syringe. 

Then, a mysterious caller called Jack and Rose, showing a footage of Rose stabbing Don Bill. He then blackmailed the two, saying he will expose the video if they won't follow his demands. They hung up the phone and called up the mystery man again. They found out that when the mystery man answered, Don Bill's children also answered, indicating that one of his children killed him. But the mystery man told them that he won't expose the video if they would bring to him a set of green, blue and pink coins in an hour, which can be found in the green, blue and pink rooms. But the key to the rooms was Don Bill himself. So they had no choice but to bring him along. 

They first went to the Blue Room. But, two security personnel, Maren and Jorge, Jack's friends and confidants, followed them. Jack asked them to take care of Don Bill's children. They went to the Blue Room. There, Don Bill's hologram told them that in order to get the Blue Coin, they have to imitate pictures and facial expressions to be flashed to them. If they got the wrong expression three times, the burglar alarm will sound off. During the course of the challenge, Jack explained to Rose that he didn't mean to hurt her. The network's management decided to only have Jack in the show. They passed the challenge and got the Blue Coin. 

Next, they went to the Green Room, which had a difficult challenge. They had to sing a song and needed to score a 100, if they reached zero, a bomb will explode. The song was "Salamat" by Yeng Constantino, which was their theme song. Don Bill said that whoever sang first should sing until the last parts. During the last parts, Jack and Rose had to sing like Jaya, Kris Aquino and Regine Velasquez-Alcasid, until they scored 100 and got the Green Coin afterwards.

Then they must find the Pink Coin. When they went to the Pink Room, Carlos, the head of security already had the Pink Coin. Jack and Rose found out that he was the one who called and blackmailed them, and also the one who killed Don Bill. Now that the coins were complete, they were brought to the vault to place the blue and pink coins, but the green coin was thrown and Jack and Carlos fought against each other. During a chase between Jack, Rose, Carlos and his men, they were caught by Liezel and Don Bill's children who recognized Jack and Rose. 

Carlos told them that Jack and Rose killed Don Bill, but the two maintained their innocence. With the help of an Ouija board, Marites was possessed by Don Bill's soul. He accused Jack and Rose of desecrating his lifeless body. He also told that it was Carlos who killed him. Carlos asked Don Bill for money because his mother was in the hospital and was due for surgery. But Don Bill refused to lend him money because he has no money left. There, he showed Carlos all of the weapons used in the 99 assassination attempts against him. He then grabbed a syringe with poison and was about to stab Carlos, but backfired. When Don Bill called for help, he was stabbed by Carlos and was killed by the poison.

Carlos then went to the secret room where he saw a vault. He didn't knew the combination but he researched other ways of opening the vault, which included the use of green, pink and blue coins. When the vault was opened, there was no money left, indicating that Don Bill was telling the truth. The reason he invited his children was to ask money from them. 

Carlos was arrested and Rose encouraged Jack to go home to his family. There, he hugged his father Bert, who was waiting for him because it was also his birthday. Jack and his family celebrated Bert's birthday. Rose became a substitute host for Jack, and both Jack, Rose and their families celebrated Christmas.

Cast

Lead Cast
Vice Ganda as Jack Cayanan
Ivana Alawi as Barbara Nicole Rose Albano

Supporting Cast
Enchong Dee as Carlos
Rez Cortez as Don Bill Libme
Candy Pangilinan as Giging
Cai Cortez as Amelia Libme, Don Bill's older daughter 
Al Tantay as Tatay Bert Cayanan 
Eian Rances as Paulo Libme, Don Bill's younger son
MC Calaquian as Jorge
Lassy Marquez as Maren
Divine Tetay as Rhed
Michael Flores as Hugo Libme, Don Bill's Eldest son
Peewee O’Hara as Lola Baby, Rose's grandmother
Marnie Lapus as Lizel
Via Antonio as Kookai
Amanda Zamora as Don Bill's younger daughter
 Vien King as Theo Cayanan, Jack's brother
 Chase Romero as Wes Cayanan's wife

Special Participation
Ion Perez as Motorcycle Max (uncredited)

Production
ABS-CBN Film Productions in 2020, announced their planned line-up of films for 2020–21 which includes a film which would star Vice Ganda and Ivana Alawi. The film was planned to be the third installment of the Praybeyt Benjamin film franchise by Wenn V. Deramas. Cathy Garcia-Molina was offered to direct the film with the working title Super Praybeyt Benjamin since Deramas is already deceased. However such film project did not push through.

Another film featuring the tandem would be worked on instead. On July 8, 2022, the Metro Manila Film Festival (MMFF) Executive Committee announced the first four official entries for the 2022 Metro Manila Film Festival which includes Vice Ganda and Ivana Alawi's Partners in Crime. The entries were entered as script submissions. Molina was tapped to direct the film.

In late August 2022, Vice met with the staffs and production team to aid in the artistic creation of the film. The film started the initial production on September 12, 2022 and began filming on September 19, 2022. On September 9, 2022, a story conference was held by the press together with the lead stars Vice and Alawi and director Molina. During the event, Alawi expressed her excitement to work with Vice, whom she and her mother look up to.

Release
Partners in Crime premiered in cinemas in the Philippines on December 25, 2022 as one of the eight entries of the 2022 Metro Manila Film Festival.

Reception

Box office
Partners in Crime has reportedly earned  on the first day of the MMFF film festival, becoming the top-grossing film among the entries. On January 1, 2023 (New Year's Day), the film has reportedly earned ₱16 million.

Accolades

References

2022 films
2022 comedy films
Filipino-language films
Films directed by Cathy Garcia-Molina
Philippine comedy films
Star Cinema comedy films